Rev. Fr. Davis Chiramel, popularly known as the Kidney Priest, is an Indian Catholic priest and the founder of the Accident Care and Transport Service (ACTS) and the Kidney Federation of India. He currently serves under the Syro-Malabar Catholic Archdiocese of Thrissur.

Early life
Davis was born at Aranattukara on 30 December 1960 as the son of Chiramel Chakkunni and Kochannam. He did schooling at Tharakan’s High school, Aranattukara and later went to St. Mary's Minor Seminary, Thope, Thrissur city and to Aluva Ponitifical Seminary for further studies. Archbishop Mar Joseph Kundukulam ordained Davis to priesthood on 30 December 1988 at St Thomas Church, Aranattukara.

Kidney donation 
Known famously as the ‘Kidney Priest’, Fr. Chiramel has been singularly responsible for half a million people in India pledging their kidneys for donation post-mortem. He himself donated a kidney to a man of the Hindu faith. He chairs the Kidney Federation of India, and serves as the general secretary of Accident Care and Transport Service (ACTS).

References

External links

 
 

1960 births
Christian clergy from Thrissur
Archdiocese of Thrissur
Syro-Malabar priests
Living people
Social workers
Indian_Eastern_Catholics
Syro-Malabar Catholics